Mimandria is a genus of moths in the family Geometridae described by Warren in 1895.

Species
Mimandria cataractae Prout, 1917
Mimandria cataractae cataractae Prout, 1917
Mimandria cataractae rhusiodocha Prout, 1934
Mimandria diospyrata (Boisduval, 1833)
Mimandria insularis Swinhoe, 1904
Mimandria kely Viette, 1971
Mimandria recognita (Saalmüller, 1891)

References

External links

Pseudoterpnini
Geometridae genera